The 2014 FIU Panthers football team represented Florida International University in the 2014 NCAA Division I FBS football season. They were led by second-year head coach Ron Turner and played their home games at FIU Stadium. They entered their second season as a member of Conference USA, competing in the East Division. They finished the season 4–8, 3–5 in C-USA play to finish in fifth place in the East Division. It was the second year in a row they had been beaten by FCS member Bethune-Cookman.

Schedule

Schedule Source:

Game summaries

Bethune-Cookman

Wagner

Pittsburgh

Louisville

UAB

Florida Atlantic

UTSA

Marshall

Rice

Old Dominion

Middle Tennessee

North Texas

References

FIU
FIU Panthers football seasons
FIU Panthers football team